The King and Queen Shipyard was an eighteenth century shipyard in Rotherhithe, London. For many years it was owned by Peter Everitt Mestaer

There was a dry dock here which dated back at least to 1663. This was adjacent to the King and Queen public house, which also gave its name to the King and Queen Waterman's Stairs. The pub closed in 1942, and both the building and the stairs were probably destroyed by bombs during the Second World War.

Ships built at the King and Queen Shipyard

References

Rotherhithe
Shipyards on the River Thames